is a train station in Makubetsu, Nakagawa District, Hokkaidō, Japan.

Lines
Hokkaido Railway Company
Nemuro Main Line Station K32

Adjacent stations

Railway stations in Japan opened in 1910
Railway stations in Hokkaido Prefecture
Makubetsu, Hokkaido